Mount Valhalla, elevation (12,135 ft), is a glaciated summit located  northwest of Valdez in the Chugach Mountains of the U.S. state of Alaska. It's set on land managed by Chugach National Forest. It is named after Valhalla, the seat of the gods in Norse mythology. The mountain was named in 1957 by Lawrence E. Nielsen because the peak is "a fitting throne of the gods." Nielsen was a member of the first ascent party on July 1, 1957. The mountain's name was officially adopted in 1965 by the U.S. Board on Geographic Names.

Climate

Based on the Köppen climate classification, Mount Valhalla is located in a subarctic climate zone with long, cold, snowy winters, and mild summers. Weather systems coming off the Gulf of Alaska are forced upwards by the Chugach Mountains (orographic lift), causing heavy precipitation in the form of rainfall and snowfall. Temperatures can drop below −20 °C with wind chill factors below −30 °C. This climate supports the Harvard, Nelchina, and Columbia Glaciers surrounding this mountain. The months May through June offer the most favorable weather for climbing or viewing.

See also

List of mountain peaks of Alaska
Geography of Alaska

References

External links
 Mt. Valhalla: Flickr photo
 Mt. Valhalla photo: Flickr
 Weather: Mount Valhalla

Valhalla
Valhalla